(pronounced as "Loo-min-ess") is a puzzle video game series developed by Q Entertainment. The core objective of the games is to survive by rotating and aligning 2×2 blocks varying between two colors to form 2×2 squares of a single color which will be erased when the Time Line passes over them. The game is lost when the blocks reach the top of the playing field.

The series was initially conceived when Tetsuya Mizuguchi heard about the PlayStation Portable and wanted to develop a game for it. Since the original release, several sequels have been developed and released for multiple platforms, including PC, PlayStation 2, PlayStation 3, PlayStation Portable, PlayStation Vita, Xbox 360, Xbox One, Nintendo Switch, mobile phone, iOS, and Android.

The series has received many positive reviews and awards with the original receiving the highest review score ratings and the majority of the awards.

Gameplay

Lumines is a block-dropping game that seems at first similar to Columns and Tetris. The game is made up of a 16×10 grid playing field. A sequence of 2×2 blocks varying between two colors fall from the top of the playing field. When part of a falling block hits an obstruction, the remaining portion will split off and continue to fall. A vertical "Time Line" sweeps through the playing field from left to right. When a group of 2×2 blocks of the same color is created on the playing field, it creates a "colored square". When the Time Line passes through it, the colored square will disappear and points are added to the player's overall score. If the colored square is created in the middle of the Time Line, the Time Line will only take half of the colored square and no points will be awarded. Certain blocks with gems are known as "special blocks" and if are used to create colored squares, they will allow all individual adjacent blocks of the same color to be eliminate by the Time Line. In some games in the series, the special block is replaced with the "chain block", which connects to all adjacent blocks, regardless if a square is created.

The games feature background skins, which change the appearance of the visuals and blocks, and contain a different music track and sound effects. Skins are unlocked by progressing through the different game modes. Skins have different Time Line speeds, depending on the track's tempo. This can affect the gameplay; faster Time Lines make it more difficult to create large combos, and slower Time Lines may cause the playing field to fill while waiting for the Time Line to erase squares.

The objective is to rotate and align the blocks in such a way as to create colored squares. Increasing score multipliers are earned by repeatedly clearing 3~4 squares (depending on the game) on consecutive Time Line sweeps. Score bonuses are also awarded by reducing all remaining tiles to one single color or for removing all non-active tiles from the screen altogether. Multiple colored squares of the same color can be shared between a single geometric shape. For example, if one should get a 2x3 area of matching blocks, the middle portion will "share" itself with both the left and right halves and create two colored squares. The player loses when the blocks pile up to the top of the grid.

Development

The series began with Lumines: Puzzle Fusion. The game was the first game developed by Q Entertainment and was a launch title for the PlayStation Portable. The game was developed with an estimated amount of 4 or 5 people for over 1 year. Mizuguchi was inspired by the PSP when he first learned about the technology. He described the PlayStation Portable as an "interactive Walkman" and "Dream machine" due to the system being one of the few video game handheld consoles with a headphone jack, allowing the game to be played at any time, any location, and any style with good sound. After choosing the PSP as the next console to work with, Mizuguchi was inspired to make a puzzle game with music. Mizuguchi stated he wanted it to be an audio-visual puzzle game for the challenge, but he also wanted to make something that was less daunting to players compared to his previous titles Rez or Space Channel 5, so that it would attract casual players. Originally, Mizuguchi wanted to make a Tetris game with music but due to various issues including licensing, it was not possible at the time and the concept of Lumines was used instead. His original hopes would eventually come to be when, in 2018, Tetris Effect was released for PS4. Lumines' subtitle "Puzzle Fusion" reflected that the game's music was essential to the game itself. Katsumi Yokota implemented strict rules for the series that the songs would follow  time signature, with the exception of "Big Elpaso". This was due to the playing field being divided into 16 rows, and the Time Line needing to match the tempo of the music and in sync with the beat. By using  time signature, it allows a total of sixteen eighth-notes to correspond to two bars precisely.

After the game was released, three titles were being developed simultaneously: Lumines Plus, Lumines II, and Lumines Live! for PlayStation 2, PSP, and Xbox 360 respectively. Tetsuya Mizuguchi wanted to achieve different things for each game. Lumines Plus was intended to be a direct port of the original Lumines: Puzzle Fusion with additional songs and skins. For Lumines II, Mizuguchi emphasized he wanted the game to have its own original atmosphere and stylistic experience, different from the original. In addition, licensed songs from famous artists such as Gwen Stefani, Black Eyed Peas and The Chemical Brothers were incorporated into the game's soundtrack. Mizuguchi described Lumines II as a  party and described himself as a party organizer to make the biggest party experience on the PSP. For Lumines Live!, Mizuguchi developed the game with the concept of customizing music and choosing and downloading new songs. The goal of the game was to use everything that was happening during the time and make it available through DLC. Mizuguchi compared the game to a TV channel where they feed what the next thing will be.

Originally development of Lumines: Puzzle Fusion, audio had to be completed before finalizing the skin's design. Yokota decided to do a different approach with Lumines II and Lumines Live!. Instead, skin designs took priority in order to provide more concrete suggestions for the audio. Yokota stated this made greater variation possible for the music tracks.

Games

Main series

Mobile phone
Multiple mobile phone titles were released in Japan, Europe, and North America. In Japan, a number of mobile phone versions were released by different carriers as part of the Lumines Mobile subseries. The first one is titled  and was released on April 18, 2007. The game changed names between carrier. i-mode's version is titled , the EZweb version is titled, and the Softbank version is titled,  A customized version of this game for DeNA's Mobage Town titled Lumines for Mobage was released on January 24, 2008. A mobile phone version of Lumines Live! was released pre-installed on NTT Docomo's N-02B model. Another version of Lumines was pre-installed on NTT Docomo's N07A mobile phone model via i-αppli widget on July 10, 2009.

In Europe and North America, two Mobile phone versions were released by Q Entertainment. The first mobile phone game was an adaptation of the original Lumines: Puzzle Fusion developed by Gameloft. The second mobile phone game, titled Lumines: In the House Ibiza '10, was developed by Connect2Media and released in Europe on August 11, 2010, and in North America on March 18, 2012. The game uses dance songs from Defected Records and skins to match the feel of Defected Records. The game contains Survival mode, Time Attack mode, Skin edit mode, and DigDown mode from previous titles. In partnership with T-Mobile, a competition was made to promote the game that ran from August 12 to August 31, 2010. Winners were awarded merchandise from Defected Records.

Reception

As of 2018, the series has sold over 2.5 million units.

The original Lumines: Puzzle Fusion won several awards including, 2005 Spike TV Video Game Awards for Best Handheld Game, GameSpot's 2005 PSP Game Of The Year, Electronic Gaming Monthly's 2005 Handheld Game Of The Year, Game Informer's "Top 50 Games of 2005" list. Lumines II'''s song,  Heavenly Star by Genki Rockets, was nominated for Best Song in 2006 Spike TV Video Game Awards.

LegacyLumines inspired multiple clones. The first is a clone for Microsoft Windows known as Luminator and was released in October 2008 by BVH Distribution.  The game features music from DKDENT and was reported to play exactly like Lumines'' with no deviation in gameplay. A Nintendo DS version was in development by Xider Games and was scheduled to release in August 2007, but no further information was released. An independent developed video game known as Irides: Master of Blocks and was released on June 24, 2009. It was developed by MadPeet and published by Goat Store Publishing on Dreamcast.

References
Notes

Citation

External links
Official site (archived from the original)
Japanese official site (archived from the original)
Official Lumines: Touch Fusion website (archived from the original)

 
Puzzle video games
Q Entertainment games
Video game franchises
Video game franchises introduced in 2004